The Snačić family, sometimes called Svačić and Svadčić, was one of the twelve noble tribes of Croatia, mentioned in the Pacta conventa and Supetar Cartulary. Among the oldest known members of the family is Petar Snačić, who is very likely to have been the last Croatian king of Croatian descent.

History 
The earliest possible known ancestor of the genus is župan Juraj Snačić, one of the twelve noblemen mentioned in Pacta conventa (1102). According to Supetar Cartulary addendum, the ban in the Kingdom of Croatia during the rule of Croatian king Demetrius Zvonimir was Petar Snačić, who is often related to last Croatian king Petar Snačić.

Information about the family is scarce. In 1343 was recorded certain Gojslav, son of a person called Prodi de Saucichorum in the Klis županija. Some historians also assume that nobleman Domald of Sidraga (c. 1160–1243) was a member of the family, but this cannot be reliably proven.

Nelipić branch 

A member of the tribe in the first half of the 14th century was Nelipac (generationis Suadcich), the head of the Nelipić family of Cetina, which is a cadet branch of the Snačić family.

In all likelihood, the Snačić family went extinct patrilineally after the death of Ban Ivan III Nelipić in 1435, and their heirdoms were given by king Sigismund to Matko and Petar Talovac.

Notable members 
Ivan Nelipić
Ivan II Nelipić
Ivan III Nelipić
Jelena Nelipić - Queen of Bosnia

See also 
Croatian nobility
Twelve noble tribes of Croatia
List of noble families of Croatia

References

Notes

Sources 

Medieval Croatian nobility
11th-century Croatian nobility
12th-century Croatian nobility